The 1947 Albanian National Championship was the tenth season of the Albanian National Championship, the top professional league for association football clubs, since its establishment in 1930.

Overview
The league was contested by 9 teams. Partizani won the championship.

League standings 

Note: 'Dinamo Korça' is Skënderbeu, '17 Nëntori' is SK Tirana, 'Ylli i Kuq Durrës' is Teuta, 'Bashkimi Elbasanas' is KS Elbasani and 'Shqiponja' is Luftëtari

Results

References
Albania - List of final tables (RSSSF)

Kategoria Superiore seasons
1
Albania
Albania